Vicente Bobadilla (5 April 1938 – 28 June 2012) was a Paraguay international football defender who won two Paraguayan Primera División championships with Club Guaraní in the 1960s.

Club
Born in Capiatá, Bobadilla started his club career with local side General Díaz in 1953.
He would play in central defense for Club Sol de América until he joined Guaraní in 1964.

International 
Bobadilla made his international debut for the Paraguay national football team in the 1960 Taça do Atlântico. He was capped 45 times for Paraguay in a national career which lasted from 1960 to 1971. He played for Paraguay at the 1963 and 1967 South American Championship.

References

External links
Profile at National-Football-Teams.com

1938 births
2012 deaths
Paraguayan footballers
General Díaz footballers
Club Sol de América footballers
Club Guaraní players
Club Olimpia footballers
Paraguayan Primera División players
Paraguay international footballers
Association football defenders